Nord-Aviation was a state-owned French aircraft manufacturer. The bulk of its facilities were based on the site of Bourges airport, in the département of Cher, in central France.

On 1 October 1954, Nord Aviation was created as a result of the acquisition of SFECMAS (Société française d'étude et de construction de matériels aéronautiques spéciaux) by SNCAN (Société nationale de constructions aéronautiques du Nord). The company's name, Nord, also became commonly used as a generic name referring to the Pingouin light aircraft. It manufactured numerous aircraft; perhaps Nord Aviation's most successful aircraft was the Nord Noratlas, a utility transport used by both military and civilian customers. Other aircraft included general aviation, trainers and experimental aircraft, as well as other transports. Nord Aviation also developed and produced its own range of missiles; perhaps the most famous of these was the Exocet, a sea-skimming anti-ship missile.

On 1 March 1970, Nord Aviation merged with Sud Aviation to create Société nationale d'industrie aérospatiale (SNIAS), which was promptly renamed Aérospatiale. In 2000, this company merged into European Aerospace Corporation EADS, which was then renamed to the Airbus Group.

History
Following the end of the Second World War, France's aviation industries began to rebuild and reestablish themselves; many companies chose to consolidate and merge with one another during this period. On 1 October 1954, Nord Aviation was created as a result of the acquisition of SFECMAS (Société française d'étude et de construction de matériels aéronautiques spéciaux) by SNCAN (Société nationale de constructions aéronautiques du Nord).

A year prior to the company's creation, the development of what can be regarded as perhaps Nord Aviation's most successful aircraft, the Nord Noratlas, had been completed. Nord continued the programme to schedule, fulfilling its initial contract for 34 aircraft by 25 June 1953; the Armée de l'Air went on to order another 174 Noratlases. Eventually, a total of 228 aircraft would enter French service. In addition to this sizable domestic appetite, the Noratlas was an export success as well; the newly formed nation of West Germany decided to address the German Air Force's requirement for new transport aircraft by ordered a total of 187 Noratlases, the first of which being delivered during 1956. While the first 25 aircraft were manufactured in France, the other 161 Noratlases were locally manufactured by the West German-based Flugzeugbau Nord company; such aircraft were designated as N-2501D. Flugzeugbau Nord had been involved in the Noratlas programme from an early stage, it being the company's first post-war aviation project, having been responsible for the design and manufacture of the majority of the aircraft's fuselage. In addition to these and other military customers, the Noratlas was also manufactured for the civil market, including a specialised de-militarised model designated N-2502A/B.

Several of Nord Aviation's aircraft never progressed beyond the experimental stage of development. One of the more radical designs was the Nord 1500 Griffon, a ramjet-powered fighter aircraft developed during the mid-1950s to fill a French Air Force specification for a Mach 2 fighter. Two prototypes were ordered initially in a letter dated 24 August 1953, with the final contract, (No. 2003/55) in 1955; although intended to eventually fulfil a requirement for a light interceptor capable of operation from 1,000m grass runways, the two prototypes were ordered without military equipment for research purposes only. Production of the envisioned operational versions, often referred to as the Super Griffon, did not take place as it was found that the requirements could be met and exceeded with less complex and cheaper aircraft such as the more conventional Dassault Mirage III.

In addition to its range of aircraft, Nord Aviation also developed and manufactured a range of missiles; perhaps the most famous of these was the Exocet, a sea-skimming anti-ship missile. Development was started by Nord during 1967 under the designation of MM 38; its basic body design was based on the AS-30 air-to-ground tactical missile. The air-launched version of the Exocet was developed during the 1970s, it entered service with the French Navy in 1979. The missile gained a level of infamy for its use during the Falklands War of 1982, in which several British ships were damaged or sunk by Exocets launched by Argentinian forces. Both the Royal Navy destroyer  and the 15,000-ton merchant ship  were lost to use of the Exocet.

On 1 March 1970, Nord Aviation merged with Sud Aviation to create Société nationale d'industrie aérospatiale (SNIAS), which was promptly renamed Aérospatiale. In turn, this company would ultimately merge into European aerospace corporation EADS in 2000, which was subsequently rebranded as the Airbus Group.

Aircraft production (for SNCAN and Nord Aviation)

Data from:Aviafrance SNCAN and Aviafrance Nord

Missiles
AA.20
AS-20
AS-30
SS.10
SS.11
SS.12/AS.12
Exocet

References
Citations

Bibliography

 Cann, John P. Flight Plan Africa: Portuguese Airpower in Counterinsurgency, 1961-1974. Helion and Company, 2015. 
 Jackson, Paul A. German Military Aviation 1956-1976''. Hinckley, Leicestershire, UK: Midland Counties Publications, 1976. .

External links
 
 Nord Aviation aircraft by Aviafrance

Aérospatiale
Defunct aircraft manufacturers of France
Defunct helicopter manufacturers
Helicopter manufacturers of France
French companies established in 1954
Manufacturing companies established in 1954
Technology companies established in 1954
Manufacturing companies disestablished in 1970
1970 disestablishments in France
1970 mergers and acquisitions